A dingbat is an ornament or spacer used in typesetting, sometimes more formally known as a "printer's ornament".

Dingbat or dingbats might also refer to:
 Dingbat, slang term referring to someone silly, notably applied to the TV character Edith Bunker by her husband
 Dingbats (board game), a board game requiring players to solve rebuses, known in America as Whatzit?
dingbat, another word for rebus derived from the game
 Dingbat (building), a type of cheap urban apartment building built between the 1950s and 1960s
 Dingbat, a paddle ball in South Africa
 Dingbat, a character created by Paul Terry
 the characters in The Dingbat Family, a comic strip drawn by George Herriman from 1910 to 1916
 Dingbat, a cartoon character who co-starred in Heathcliff and Dingbat
 Dingbat, slang term, used as an alternate name for the Dignity Battalions
 Dingbat, a placeholder name for a random or unknown object
 Dingbats (Unicode block), a Unicode block
 Ornamental Dingbats, a Unicode block

See also 
 The Dingbats of Danger Street, a DC Comics kids' team created by Jack Kirby